Edward John Hutchins (27 December 1809, in Briton Ferry, Glamorganshire – 11 February 1876, in Hastings) was a Liberal MP, railway director and Freemason.

Birth and education
Hutchins was the son of Edward Hutchins of Gloucester and his wife, Sarah Guest, a sister of the MP and ironfounder Sir Josiah John Guest. He was educated at Charterhouse School and St John's College, Cambridge.

In Parliament

Hutchins was elected as an MP for Penryn and Falmouth in January 1840 with a majority of 221 and sat until the general election of 1841. His opponent was the Conservative, Mr Carne, who polled 238 votes.

At the 1841 general election, he unsuccessfully contested Southampton; and although his opponents were subsequently unseated on petition, he did not obtain the seat.

He was unsuccessful once again in July 1847 when he attempted to become the member for Poole.

Finally he was returned for Lymington at a by-election, in April 1850. He held the seat until his retirement from Parliament in 1857.

In 1870, he was part of a Catholic Lobby group concerning the Education Bill. He was a member of the London School Board representing Marylebone from 1870 - 1873.

Civic duties

He was a magistrate and deputy-lieutenant for Glamorganshire, and a magistrate for Brecon and Monmouthshire.

Business interests

After Cambridge, Hutchins joined his uncle, Sir John Josiah Guest, running the family business, the Dowlais Iron Works. In 1851, Hutchins became the Chairman of the Rhymney Iron Works, holding the chairmanship until 1875.

Also in 1875, he resigned as a director of the London and South Western Railway, having served for several years.

He was chairman of the Taff Valley Wagon Company.

Marriage
On 10 October 1838, in Baltimore, Maryland he married Isabel Clara, daughter of the Chevalier Don Juan de Bernaben, of Alicante, in Spain, who survived him.

Masonic role
He was Provincial Grand Master of South Wales from 1848 to 1856

Death
He died after a lingering illness in Hastings.

References
This article incorporates text from The Times, 19 February 1876, issue 28557, p. 7, Column D, a publication now in the public domain in the United States.

External links 

Liberal Party (UK) MPs for English constituencies
Members of the Parliament of the United Kingdom for Penryn and Falmouth
1809 births
1876 deaths
People educated at Charterhouse School
Alumni of St John's College, Cambridge
Members of the London School Board
UK MPs 1837–1841
UK MPs 1847–1852
UK MPs 1852–1857